Chinese-Canadian rapper and singer Kris Wu has released one studio album, one extended play and twenty-two singles.

Studio albums

Extended plays

Singles

Production credits

Notes

References

Discographies of Chinese artists
Discographies of Canadian artists